Concrete Jungle is a role-playing game supplement published by TSR in 1985 for the Marvel Super Heroes role-playing game.

Contents
Concrete Jungle is a supplement describing over 50 heroes and villains based in New York, focusing on Spider-Man and his enemies, and including the Punisher, Daredevil, the Black Widow, Bullseye, and Cloak and Dagger.

Publication history
MHAC7 Concrete Jungle was written by Jeff Grubb, with a cover by Charles Vess, and was published by TSR, Inc., in 1985 as a 32-page book.

Reception
The supplement holds reviews of four stars from RPGnet.

References

Marvel Comics role-playing game supplements
Role-playing game supplements introduced in 1985